Ken's Artisan Pizza is a pizzeria in southeast Portland, Oregon, United States.

History
The pizzeria opened in Portland's Kerns neighborhood in 2006.

Reception
In 2017, Samantha Bakall of The Oregonian ranked Ken's number one on her list of "Portland's 27 best wood-fired pizzas". Brooke Jackson-Glidden and Alex Frane of Eater Portland included the restaurant in their 2019 list of "15 Essential Pizzerias in Portland".

See also
 Pizza in Portland, Oregon

References

External links

 
 
 Ken's Artisan Pizza at The Daily Meal
 Ken’s Artisan Pizza at Frommer's
 Ken's Artisan Pizza at Lonely Planet
 Ken's Artisan Pizza at Portland Mercury
 Make the Margherita from Ken’s Artisan Pizza at Home at Portland Monthly
 Portland, Oregon: Ken's Artisan Pizza at Serious Eats
 Ken's Artisan Pizza at Thrillist
 Ken's Artisan Pizza at Travel + Leisure
 Ken's Artisan Pizza at Zagat

2006 establishments in Oregon
Kerns, Portland, Oregon
Pizzerias in Portland, Oregon
Restaurants established in 2006